Shane Clipfell (born August 29, 1963) is the current head coach of the Western Michigan University women's basketball team.

Career
He accepted the head coaching position at Western Michigan in April 2012. Prior to Western Michigan he was on Suzy Merchant's staff at Eastern Michigan from 1998 to 2007 and Michigan State from 2007 to 2012. He was acting as the head coach for much of the 2006–07 season while Merchant was on maternity leave. Early in his career he was an assistant coach and the head coach at Glen Oaks Community College and Colon High School. He compiled a 58–35 overall record at Glen Oaks. His 1997 team finished ranked #3 in the NJCAA and he was National District Coach of the Year. He led the Colon Magi to seven league titles, a Final Four, and a 185–65 overall record in 11 total years at the helm and was Michigan Regional Coach of the Year in 1992, 1994 and 1995.

He had previously played basketball and football at Colon High School.

Head coaching record

 Acting as head coach. Suzy Merchant missed all but four games of 2006–07 while on maternity leave.  EMU was 3–1 under Merchant
 Overall Record includes his 58–35 record at Glen Oaks.

Personal life
While an assistant at Eastern Michigan he earned a bachelor's degree in communications. He and his wife, Connie, have two children.

References

External links
Western Michigan Broncos coaching bio

Living people
1963 births
Place of birth missing (living people)
Western Michigan Broncos women's basketball coaches
American women's basketball coaches
Eastern Michigan University alumni
Eastern Michigan Eagles women's basketball coaches
Michigan State Spartans women's basketball coaches
Basketball coaches from Michigan
Junior college women's basketball coaches in the United States